The TRS-80 MC-10 microcomputer is a lesser-known member of the TRS-80 line of home computers, produced by Tandy Corporation in the early 1980s and sold through their RadioShack chain of electronics stores. It was a low-cost alternative to Tandy's own TRS-80 Color Computer to compete with entry-level machines such as the VIC-20 and Sinclair ZX81.

The MC-10 was of value primarily to hobbyists and as an introduction to computer programming. It was not a commercial success and was discontinued only a year after its introduction.

Description 

About the size of a hardcover book, the MC-10 has four kilobytes (4096 bytes) of RAM, a Motorola MC6803 eight-bit microprocessor, a built-in serial port, and graphics capabilities similar to those of the original Color Computer (provided by the same MC6847 video display generator).

The MC-10 includes a BASIC interpreter in ROM and uses regular audio cassettes for bulk storage. Text and graphics are displayed on a television set via a built-in RF modulator. Less common for machines in its class is the integrated RS-232 serial port, which allows the MC-10 to use line printers and modems without additional hardware.

At the time of its release in 1983, the MC-10's specifications were underwhelming (at least for its home market; North America). Disk drives, full-travel keyboards, medium-resolution graphics, and complete 64-kilobyte (65,536 bytes) memory banks were becoming popular features for home computers; the MC-10 offered none of these, severely limiting the functions it could perform and the range of users to whom it could appeal.

The MC-10 was discontinued in 1984, along with the 16 KB (16,384 bytes) memory upgrade and small amount of cassette-based software that had been released for it.

Specifications 
 VDG: MC6847
 Text: 32×16
 Low-res: 64×32, 8 color (4bpp)
 Low-res: 64×48, 2 color (not fully implemented)
 Low-res: 64×64, 4 color (2bpp)
 Med-res: 128×64, 2 color (1bpp)
 Med-res: 128×64, 4 color (2bpp)
 Med-hi: 128×96, 2 color (1bpp)
 Med-hi: 128×96, 4 color (2bpp)
 Hi-res: 128×192, 2 color (1bpp)
 Hi-res: 128×192, 4 color (2bpp) (partially supported, insufficient video RAM)
 Hi-res: 256×192, 2 color (1bpp) (partially supported, insufficient video RAM)
 I/O Ports:
 RS-232C serial interface (300-9600 baud; 600 baud from BASIC)
 Cassette interface (1500 baud)
 Internal RF modulator
 Memory expansion interface

Although the memory expansion interface connected directly to the CPU bus and could have been used for many applications, the edge connector involved had an unusual number of pins and was difficult to obtain.

The RS-232C serial interface had extremely limited usefulness. Although the 6803 CPU conveniently includes a built-in UART, it was left unconnected and did not assist the RS-232C interface in any manner. In part, this is because a single 3.58 MHz TV colorburst crystal is used to generate video and clock the CPU, and this clock rate could not be divided by an integer to obtain any standard baud rate for the UART. As a result, programs have to shift bits individually into and out of the RS-232C interface, a mode of operation that entails atypical and especially critical timing requirements.

The cassette interface has similar difficulties, plus a few. Although Micro Color Basic includes an undocumented CLOADM command for loading machine-language programs and an undocumented VARPTR function for manipulating variables as memory, there is no corresponding CSAVEM command (documented or otherwise) to permit machine language programs to be saved to tape.

Software 
A limited amount of software was available on cassette for the MC-10, including Lunar Lander, Checkers, and a machine-language Pinball program. However, as most programs written in Basic for other TRS-80 models were compatible with the MC-10, many books with BASIC programs were available for the user who was willing to type in the code.

Clone 

A clone of the MC-10, the Alice, was marketed in France through a collaboration among Tandy, Matra and Hachette.

References

External links 

 Old-Computers.com
 OldComputers.net
 Browser based emulator for the MC-10

Home computers